The 2013 European Diving Championships was the third edition of the European Diving Championships and took place from 18 to 23 June 2013 in Rostock, Germany. A total of eleven disciplines were contested.

Results

Medal table

Men

Women

Mixed

Participating nations
100 athletes from 19 nations competed.

  (3)
  (4)
  (5)
  (5)
  (1)
  (11)
  (9)
  (4)
  (6)
  (12)
  (1)
  (4)
  (3)
  (2)
  (2)
  (11)
  (2)
  (3)
  (12)

References

External links
Official website

 
2013
2013 European Diving Championships
European Diving Championships
European Diving Championships